KATW (101.5 FM, "101.5 Cat FM") is a radio station broadcasting a hot adult contemporary music format. Licensed to Lewiston, Idaho, United States, the station serves the Lewiston area.  The station is currently owned by Pacific Empire Radio Corporation and features programming from Premiere Radio Networks and Westwood One.

References

External links

ATW
Hot adult contemporary radio stations in the United States